Treadway Racing is a former auto racing team that competed in the early seasons of the Indy Racing League IndyCar Series.  The team was owned by Indianapolis business man Fred Treadway. Prior to the IRL's inaugural season in 1996, Treadway was able to sign former Indianapolis 500 Champion Arie Luyendyk to drive for his freshman team. Additionally, two long time backers of IndyCar teams, Bryant Heating & Cooling Systems and Jonathan Byrd's Cafeteria, were secured as sponsors.

1996 racing season
Luyendyk brought home the team's first win in their second race together, winning the Dura-Lube 200 at Phoenix International Raceway.  Later that season Luyendyk would set two qualifying records at the Indianapolis 500.  Luyendyk would run  over the four lap run, during this run he also set the one-lap record of 237.498-mph. This run would not put Luyendyk on the pole position however, as the run was on the second day of time trials. Luyendyk's attempt on the first day of qualifications was disallowed when he failed technical inspection although it was good enough for the pole. His day two attempt was faster than his day one attempt. Ultimately Luyendyk was knocked out of the race in an accident.

1997 racing season
The following year, good fortunes would continue to the race into the race as Luyendyk would win the 1997 Indianapolis 500 for Treadway Racing from the pole; new teammate Scott Goodyear finished second, making it a 1-2 sweep for Treadway Racing.  Luyendyk would follow up by winning the True Value 500 at Texas Motor Speedway a fortnight later.  The race is best remembered for the scoring controversy that would lead to USAC being removed from sanctioning duties by the IRL.  Goodyear's more consistent results would put him one spot ahead of Luyendyk in the final season standings for 1997 despite not collecting a win.

1998 racing season
For 1998 Goodyear left Treadway Racing, leaving Luyendyk as the sole driver.  Luyendyk won the final race of the season at Las Vegas Motor Speedway before retiring from full-time racing.

1999 racing season
Sam Schmidt was signed to replace Luyendyk for 1999 season. He would deliver the team a win at Las Vegas as Luyendyk had the prior season. This late season win combined with finishing 5th in the final season standings gave the team high hopes for 2000. An opportunity to achieve this success would not occur as a devastating pre-season testing injury at Walt Disney World Speedway would leave Schmidt paralyzed. The accident would leave Robby McGehee who had been signed to partner Schmidt as the team's sole driver. McGehee would only last one season.

2001 racing season
Felipe Giaffone would take the team's seat in 2001, bringing with him personal sponsorship from Hollywood Cigarettes. Ross & Diana Hubbard also joined the team as partners to Fred Treadway. Giaffone and the Hubbards would also last only one season.

2002 racing season
For 2002 Treadway's son Rick Treadway drove for the team for the first half of the season with Will Langhorne competing select events at the season's end. As teams from the CART World Series began to enter the IRL costs began to rise and squeeze out small teams such as Treadway Racing. The 2002 Chevy 500 at Texas Motor Speedway was Treadway Racing's final race in the Indy Racing League's top series.

Treadway Racing Drivers
Full-Time Drivers
 Felipe Giaffone (2001)
 Scott Goodyear (1997)
 Arie Luyendyk (1996-'98)
 Robby McGehee (2000)
 Sam Schmidt (1999)
 Rick Treadway (2002)

Part-Time/Indy-Only Drivers
 Raul Boesel (2000)
 Will Langhorne (2002)
 Jason Leffler (2000)
 Arie Luyendyk (1999, 2001-'02)

Complete IRL/IndyCar Series Results
(key) (Results in bold indicate pole position; results in italics indicate fastest lap)

 1 The 1999 VisionAire 500K at Charlotte was cancelled after 79 laps due to spectator fatalities.

IndyCar wins

References

IndyCar Series teams
American auto racing teams